Delta High School is a public high school in Delta, Ohio, United States. It is the only high school in the Pike–Delta–York Local School District. School colors are green and white and athletic teams are known as the Panthers who compete as members of the Northwest Ohio Athletic League.

Athletics

State championships
 Boys wrestling – 1989, 1996, 1998, 1999, 2014, 2016
 Boys track and field – 1934

References

External links

High schools in Fulton County, Ohio
Public high schools in Ohio